Eduino Francini (17 December 1925 – 27 March 1944) was an Italian partisan.

Biography
Francini was born in Massa Carrara and grew up in Sansepolcro. He was the commander of a partisan company which played an important role in the insurrection of Sansepolcro (19 March 1944) against the Nazi-Fascist occupation. Some days later, he was captured and killed with eight comrades in Villa Santinelli (Umbertide), after a long fight with superior Nazi forces.

Bibliography
 
 
 
 
 
 
 

1925 births
1944 deaths
Italian resistance movement members